Ivankovo is a village and a municipality in the Vukovar-Syrmia County, Slavonia in Croatia.

The total population is 8,006 (census 2011), in the following settlements:
 Ivankovo, population 6,194
 Prkovci, population 549
 Retkovci, population 1,263

In the 2011 census, of the 8,006 inhabitants, 99.66% were Croats.

See also
Ivankovo railway station

References

Municipalities of Croatia
Populated places in Syrmia
Populated places in Vukovar-Syrmia County